Ben Gannon may refer to:

 Ben Gannon (cricketer) (born 1975), English cricketer
 Ben Gannon (producer) (1952–2007), Australian film, television and stage producer